Siddi Sambal  was the Siddi admiral of the Mughal Empire. On 10 October 1673, he and his fleet entered Bombay without permission from the British. They destroyed the Pen and Nagothan rivers which were very important for the British and the Maratha King Shivaji.

References
An African Indian Community in Hyderabad By Ababu Minda Yimene, p. 94

Mughal generals
History of Mumbai
Maritime history of India
Naval battles involving Marathas
Naval battles involving the British East India Company
Naval history of India
17th-century Indian Muslims
Siddhi people